Is It Fall Yet? is a 2000 American animated comedy-drama television film written by Glenn Eichler and Peggy Nicoll, and directed by Karen Disher and Guy Moore. Originally broadcast on August 27, 2000, it was the first of two film-length installments for MTV's animated series Daria.

The film chronicles the characters' summer break between seasons four and five. It was released on VHS and DVD on January 15, 2002, and was included on the DVD release of Daria: The Complete Animated Series on May 11, 2010.

Plot

Though Daria and Jane are still on speaking terms, Jane is cold toward Daria, and their relationship is tense. Daria and Tom are seeing each other romantically, but due to Daria's personality and the gravity of the situation, they are taking things slowly. Jane has signed up for a summer art camp, seemingly to avoid Daria. At the camp, Jane meets Alison, an older artist, and the two bond over mutual contempt for their pretentious mentor and equally pretentious peers. However, Alison repeatedly tries to come onto Jane, dismissing Jane's protests that she is straight. The next time they meet, Jane signals uncertainty about her own sexuality.  But this turns to anger when she realizes that, after previously putting down their pompous instructor to ingratiate herself with Jane, Alison is now sleeping with him to further her career. This causes Jane to become disillusioned with the art world.

Daria intends to do nothing but read, sleep, and hang out with her friends and boyfriend, but her mother Helen forces her to work as a counselor at English teacher Timothy O'Neill's summer day camp for pre-pubescent children. There, Daria meets a nihilistic camper named Link, who constantly voices his disillusionment. It is loosely implied that he is neglected and emotionally abused by his mother and his stepfather. Recognizing herself in Link, Daria attempts to reach out to him. However, he rejects her overtures, causing Daria to feel worse. Paralleling these emotions is her relationship with Tom, which she effectively ends for the discomfort it brings.

After getting a poor score on a pre-college admissions exam, Quinn desperately wants to prove her intelligence without ruining her image in the fashion club. Helen hires David, a no-nonsense tutor who gets Quinn to take learning more seriously. As the tutoring gets results, Quinn realizes that she is interested in David romantically. At their final session, she confesses her feelings to him, but David says she is not his type due to her low academic aspirations, noting that the college Quinn wants to attend is a party school. In a heart-to-heart talk with Daria, Quinn shows how much the rejection hurt her, but Daria convinces her that it is worthwhile to "give people a chance" even though things might not work out. The talk makes Daria consider whether she broke up with Tom prematurely.

Daria comes to visit Jane, and, due to some meddling from Jane's brother Trent, the two reconcile. Daria later tells Jane that she was always impressed by Jane's strong sense of identity, which resolves Jane's identity crisis. Daria receives a letter from Link that invites her to email him, assuaging her fears that she is incapable of connecting with another human being. Jane affirms that she is no longer upset that Daria dated Tom and encourages her to get back together with him.

Cast
 Tracy Grandstaff as Daria Morgendorffer
 Wendy Hoopes as Jane Lane, Helen Morgendorffer and Quinn Morgendorffer
 Julián Rebolledo as Jake Morgendorffer
 Alvaro J. Gonzales as Trent Lane
 Russell Hankin as Tom Sloane
 Marc Thompson as Anthony DiMartino, Timothy O'Neill, Kevin Thompson and Jamie White
 Tim Novikoff as Jeffy
 Steven Huppert as Joey
 Jessica Cyndee Jackson as Jodie Landon
 Amir Williams as Michael Jordan "Mack-Daddy" Mackenzie
 Janie Mertz/Lisa Kathleen Collins as Sandi Griffin and Brittany Taylor
 Sarah Drew as Stacy Rowe
 Ashley Albert as Tiffany Blum-Decker
 Nora Laudani as Angela Li
 Bart Fastbender as Andrew Landon
 Laurine Towler as Michele Landon
 Corey Block as Link
 Carson Daly as David Sorenson
 Dave Grohl as Daniel Dotson
 Bif Naked as Alison
 John Lynn as Sick, Sad World announcer

References

External links

 
 

Daria films
2000 television films
2000 animated films
2000 films
2000 comedy-drama films
2000 LGBT-related films
2000s American animated films
2000s English-language films
2000s high school films
2000s teen comedy-drama films
American adult animated films
American animated comedy films
American animated television films
American comedy-drama television films
American high school films
American LGBT-related television films
American teen comedy-drama films
American teen LGBT-related films
Animated drama films
Animated films about friendship
Female bisexuality in film
Films directed by Karen Disher
LGBT-related animated films
LGBT-related comedy-drama films
MTV animated films
MTV original films
Television films based on television series